Weaver Lake may refer to:

Weaver Lake (Michigan)
Weaver Lake (New York)